George Paul Platukis (March 15, 1915–May 17, 1973) was an American football end who played five seasons in  the NFL with the Pittsburgh Steelers and the Cleveland Rams.  He later became a high school teacher and baseball coach.

Early life
Platukis was born in West Hazleton, Pennsylvania and attended West Hazleton High School.

He  matriculated at Duquesne University.

Football  career
Platukis was selected by the Pittsburgh Pirates in the sixth round of the 1938 NFL Draft.  He played for the Pirates (renamed the Steelers in 1941) for four seasons.

Platukis was traded by the Pittsburgh Steelers in August 1942 to the Cleveland Rams  in exchange for John Binotto and Milt Simington.  He spent a final season with the Rams.

Post-football career
After completing his football career, Platukis returned to Hazleton, Pennsylvania where he became a high school teacher and head baseball coach at his alma mater, West Hazleton High School.

Personal life
Platukis was married to Irene Pekala.  The couple had four children: George Jr., Paulette, Paul and James.  He was an ardent fisherman.  He died of an apparent heart attack on May 17, 1973, while on a fishing trip near his home with his son and grandson.

References

1915 births
1973 deaths
People from Luzerne County, Pennsylvania
Players of American football from Pennsylvania
American football wide receivers
American football defensive backs
Duquesne Dukes football players
Pittsburgh Steelers players
Cleveland Rams players